HM Prison Channings Wood is a Category C men's prison, located in the parish of Ogwell (near Newton Abbot) in Devon, England. The prison is operated by His Majesty's Prison Service.

History
The United States Army built a camp in Ogwell and shooting range in Denbury in the run up to the invasion of Europe in 1944. The site was taken over by the Royal Corps of Signals junior training Regiment. The construction of Channings Wood Prison began on the former Ministry of Defence site in 1973, by a combination of contract and prison labour. The prison officially opened in July 1974,although some of the wooden huts remained in use whilst building and landscaping continued into the eighties.

From the 1990s Channings Wood gained a reputation for pioneering therapeutic work to reform sex offenders and drug addicts. This was confirmed in a report by His Majesty's Chief Inspector of Prisons in April 2003, however the report noted that overcrowding at Channings Wood was putting this good work at risk. Further accommodation was constructed at the prison in 2003.

Channings Wood was praised again in a report in 2005 which highlighted the prison's education programme, accommodation and levels of safety. However, a year later ten inmates staged a roof-top protest at the prison for 28 hours. The prisoners were "protesting about their food being cooked by prisoners on the sex offender registry." The protest ended peacefully.

A new 64-bed unit was opened at Channings Wood in 2007. The new wing houses the specialist Therapeutic Community which tackles drug misuse issues amongst prisoners.

The prison today
Channings Wood Prison houses offenders serving a wide range of sentence lengths, and predominantly receives new arrivals from local prisons across the South West Area. Two of the residential living blocks at the prison make up the Vulnerable Prisoners Unit which specialises in delivering Sex Offender Treatment Programmes.

The prison provides educational courses to prisoners, include Barbering, Business Studies, Catering, Industrial Cleaning, Creative Media Studies, Customer Services, Driving Theory, Dry-Lining, Electrical Installation, ESOL, Food Hygiene, Fork Lift Driving, Horticulture, Information Technology, Painting and Decorating, Physical Education and Yoga. It also offers employment opportunities.

The prison offers a gym and league sports. The prison chaplaincy offers a chapel and multi-faith room to inmates and staff at the prison.

Notable former inmates
 Luke McCormick
 Harry Roberts

References

External links
 Ministry of Justice pages on HMP Channings Wood
HMP Channings Wood - HM Inspectorate of Prisons Reports

Category C prisons in England
Prisons in Devon
1974 establishments in England
Men's prisons